Anne Burras was an early English settler in Virginia and an Ancient Planter. She was the first English woman to marry in the New World, and her daughter Virginia Laydon was the first child of English colonists to be born in the Jamestown colony. Anne Burras arrived in Jamestown on September 30, 1608, on the Mary and Margaret, the ship bringing the Second Supply.  She came as a 14-year-old maid to Mrs. Thomas Forrest. In November or December 1608, Anne married John Laydon/Layton/Leyden.  The Laydons had four daughters, Virginia, Alice, Katherine, and Margaret.  All six members of the Laydon family were listed in the muster of February 1624/5.  According to the muster, Anne was 30 years of age when the muster was taken.  All four children are listed as born in Virginia; their ages are not given.

John Laydon was shown as having 200 acres in Henrico in May 1625.  However, the 1624/5 muster shows the family living in Elizabeth City.  A patent to "John Leyden, Ancient Planter", dated December 2, 1628, refers to 100 acres on the east side of Blunt Point Creek, "land now in tenure of Anthony Burrowes and William Harris, and said land being in lieu of 100 acres in the Island of Henrico".

No proof has been found of the marriage of any of the four daughters, though it has been suggested, on the basis of land records, that one daughter may have married John Hewitt or Howitt.

References

Further reading 

 John Smith, The Generall Historie of Virginia, New England & The Summer Isles (Glasgow, Scotland: James MacLehose and Sons, 1907), Vol. 1: 203–05
 Kelso, William M.  Jamestown, the Buried Truth Copyright 2006
 John Smith, A True Relation of Occurrences and Accidents in Virginia, 1608.  https://web.archive.org/web/20130928085017/http://etext.lib.virginia.edu/etcbin/jamestown-browse?id=J1007

External links
 

Colonial American women
Virginia colonial people
English emigrants
17th-century deaths
Year of birth unknown
People from James City County, Virginia